Yousef Al-Salem (4 May 1985 – 12 February 2023) was a Saudi Arabian professional footballer who played as a striker for several clubs most notably Al-Ettifaq and Al-Hilal.

Career
Al-Salem began his career at Al-Qadsiah and made his debut during the 2004–05 season. Following the club's relegation to the First Division in 2008, Al-Salem joined Al-Shabab. In his single season with the club, Al-Salem won the King Cup and Prince Faisal bin Fahd Cup. In July 2009, Al-Salem joined Al-Ettifaq on a four-year contract. He scored 52 goals in 132 appearances in his four seasons at the club. Following the expiry, Al-Salem joined Al-Hilal on a free transfer. Despite not establishing himself as a starter for the club, Al-Salem went on to make 66 appearances and scored 10 goals with the club. He also won three titles with Al-Hilal. In September 2016, Al-Salem returned to Al-Ettifaq following his release by Al-Hilal. In March 2020, after almost two years without a club, Al-Salem joined Saudi Second Division side Al-Jubail on a six-month contract. In October 2020, Al-Salem joined Al-Thoqbah.

Al-Salem was a full international, who earned caps at all youth levels. He helped the under-23 side win the 2008 GCC U-23 Championship. He made his senior debut in 2007 and scored three goals for the senior side.

Death
Al-Salem died on 12 February 2023, at the age of 37.

Career statistics

Club

International

Scores and results list Saudi Arabia's goal tally first, score column indicates score after each Al-Salem goal.

Honours
Al-Shabab
King Cup: 2009
Prince Faisal bin Fahd Cup: 2008–09

Al-Hilal
King Cup: 2015
Saudi Super Cup: 2015
Saudi Crown Prince Cup: 2015–16

Saudi Arabia U23
GCC U-23 Championship: 2008

References

External links

1985 births
2023 deaths
People from Dammam
Saudi Arabian footballers
Al-Qadsiah FC players
Al-Shabab FC (Riyadh) players
Ettifaq FC players
Al Hilal SFC players
Al-Jubail Club players
Al-Thoqbah Club players
Saudi Arabia international footballers
Saudi Professional League players
Saudi Second Division players
Saudi First Division League players
Saudi Third Division players
Association football forwards